Anna Reynolds (born 1 June 1968) is a British novelist, playwright, and screenwriter. She is the author of Tightrope (1991) and Jordan, which was voted "Best Play of 1992" at the Writers Guild Awards, and co-author of The Winding Sheet, a film that won a Silver Hugo at the Chicago Film Festival. Her first novel, Insanity, was published in 1996.

Publications
Reynolds has had 10 plays professionally produced, including Jordan, Red (Clean Break Theatre Company), Precious (West Yorkshire Playhouse), Wild Things (Salisbury Playhouse), Look At Me (Theatre Centre/Mercury Theatre), Deep Joy (Mercury Theatre), Skin Hunger (Time Out Critics Choice, BAC), Ring Road Tales (Watford Palace Theatre), and Sweetie Pie (Menagerie Theatre Company, Cambridge Arts Centre and Latchmere Theatre London). Her screenplay Paradise was broadcast by the BBC and The Winding Sheet by Channel 4 Television in the UK.

She has written for The Times, The Guardian, New Statesman, The Observer, and The Big Issue.

She is one of the founders of the British writers' group writewords.org.uk.

Personal life
In 1986, at the age of 17, Anna Reynolds suffered a severe episode of premenstrual stress syndrome, which led to the death of her mother. Reynolds' was initially convicted for murder, but after she had served 2 years at Durham Prison, the verdict was overturned based on evidence provided by Dr Katharina Dalton, clarifying that the incident was the result of the condition.

References

1968 births
British women novelists
Living people
People educated at Magdalen College School, Brackley
British women dramatists and playwrights
20th-century British novelists
20th-century British dramatists and playwrights
20th-century British women writers
21st-century British dramatists and playwrights
21st-century British women writers
British screenwriters
British women screenwriters